The ancient Egyptian Leopard head hieroglyph, Gardiner sign listed no. F9 is a portrayal of the head of a leopard; it is in the Gardiner subset for "parts of mammals".

In the Egyptian language, the Leopard head hieroglyph is used as a determinative or abbreviation for words relating to 'strength'. In the language it is used for pehti-(pḥty).

See also
Gardiner's Sign List#F. Parts of Mammals
List of Egyptian hieroglyphs

References

 .

Egyptian hieroglyphs: parts of mammals